Michael Kenny is professor of public policy at the University of Cambridge. Kenny was the first director of the Mile End Institute and sits on the Leverhulme Trust's advisory committee. He is co-director of the British Academy's "Governing England" programme, and is a member of the expert panel set up by the Scottish Parliament to advise on the constitutional implications of Brexit.

References

Living people
Academics of Queen's University Belfast
Academics of the University of Sheffield
Academics of Queen Mary University of London
Fellows of Fitzwilliam College, Cambridge
Year of birth missing (living people)
British political scientists